Unistalda is a municipality of the western part of the state of Rio Grande do Sul, Brazil. The population is 2,321 (2020 est.) in an area of 602.39 km².  Its elevation is 361 m.  It is located west of the state capital of Porto Alegre and northeast of Alegrete.

References

External links
https://web.archive.org/web/20070930204602/http://www.citybrazil.com.br/rs/unistalda/ 

Municipalities in Rio Grande do Sul